Gaurav is an Indian and Nepalese male name. The name literally means '''honor', 'pride' or 'respect'.

Notable people named Gaurav
Gaurav S Bajaj (born 1990), Indian television actor
Gaurav Bhatt, Indian Music Director, singer, songwriter. 
Gaurav Chakrabarty (born 1987),  Indian (Bengali) actor
Gaurav Chanana, Indian model, and film and television actor
Gaurav Chaudhary (born 1991), Indian YouTuber
Gaurav Chopra (born 1979), Indian actor
Gaurav Dagaonkar (born 1982), Indian singer
Gaurav Dhiman (born 1986), Indian cricketer
Gaurav Gera (born 1973), Indian stand-up comedian and actor
Gaurav Ghei (born 1968), Indian golfer
Gaurav Gill (born 1981), Indian race car driver
Gaurav Keerthi (born 1979), Singaporean television personality
Gaurav Khanna (born 1981), Indian television actor
Gaurav Nanda, Indian film, TV and theatre actor
Gaurav Natekar (born 1972), Indian tennis player
Gaurav Sharma, (born 1992), Indian author and novelist
Gaurav Shumsher JB Rana (born 1955), Retired Chief of Army Staff of The Nepalese Army
Gaurav Singh (Mizoram cricketer) (born 1999), Indian cricketer
Gaurav Singh (Uttarakhand cricketer) (born 1996), Indian cricketer
Gaurav Tiwari (1984–2016), Indian paranormal investigator

Nepalese masculine given names